Óláfs saga Tryggvasonar is the name of several closely related works on the life of the king Olaf Tryggvason - these include : 

 A lost version in latin  by Oddr Snorrason
 A lost version in latin by Gunnlaugr Leifsson
 Óláfs saga Tryggvasonar in Heimskringla
 A version in the Fagrskinna
 Óláfs saga Tryggvasonar en mesta also known as Mesta or the Greatest Saga of Óláfr Tryggvason
 Óláfs saga Tryggvasonar in Flateyjarbók (a version of Mesta)